The Dropout Prevention Act – also known as: Title I, Part H, of No Child Left Behind – is responsible for establishing the school dropout prevention program under No Child Left Behind. This part of No Child Left Behind was created to provide schools with support for retention of all students and prevention of dropouts from the most at-risk youth. It is estimated that 1.2 million American students drop out of high school each year. The US Department of Education assesses the dropout rate by calculating the percentage of 16- to 24-year-olds who are not currently enrolled in school and who have not yet earned a high school credential. For example, the high school dropout rate of the United States in 2008 was 8.1%.

The Dropout Prevention Act is, like No Child Left Behind, based on scientifically based research (SBR). This research is monitored by The US Department of Education, Office of the Inspector General.

This particular grant program provides funding to State Education Agency, and/or the local school districts. These funds are used for research-based and coordinated school dropout prevention programs for students in grades 6-12. This research-based approach is a major component of No Child Left Behind. The specific grants are used for the support of programs such as: professional development, reduction of teacher-student ratios, counseling for at-risk students, and mentor programs for those same at-risk students.

Finally, the act provided that the US Department of Education would create a national recognition program that would identify schools that have been effective in lowering their dropout rates.

Historical context

Statistical research shows that one-third of most American students are labeled as at-risk for academic failure, with dropping out of school being the main result of this failure.

Historically, an extreme amount of pressure is placed on our schools to raise test scores, with very little attention paid to ensuring that students graduated. When the Bush Administration passed No Child Left Behind in 2002, they took a major step toward dropout accountability by instituting the Dropout Prevention Act within the law.

The grants that come from this act are awarded for up to 60 months to local education agencies (LEA’s) and state education agencies (SEA’s) to support those agencies in student dropout prevention and reentry efforts for students that have dropped out. These grants can be used for the following:

 The early and continued identification of students at risk of not graduating.
Identifying and encouraging youth who have left school without graduating to reenter and graduate.
Implementing other comprehensive approaches.
Implementing transition programs to help the successful transition from middle school to high school.

An example of one program that was used as a model is the Project Success Program that was implemented at Bainbridge High School in Georgia. Students that enroll in the program are/have:

typically economically disadvantaged.
 scored below the 25th percentile on a standardized test.
 received a grade of “D” or below in a vocational class.
 in need of support services.

The Project Success initiative focuses on student advancement in a vocational field, while also remediating any deficiencies that the student has in reading, mathematics, or language.

Moreover, the stress of this act is to reach students at the onsite of any at-risk behavior, specifically lower standardized test scores, as research suggests that the gap between standardized test scores and classroom performance only increases with time.

Policy changing over time

There have been major changes in the appropriations for this portion of NCLB. As you can see in the list below, major appropriations were made from 2004-2006. Then, this portion of the act stopped getting all funding from 2007-2009. Finally, the Dropout Prevention Act received $50,000,000 in 2010 to use for school appropriations.

Fiscal Year 2010 $50,000,000 
Fiscal Year 2009 $0 
Fiscal Year 2008 $0 
Fiscal Year 2007 $0 
Fiscal Year 2006 $4,851,000 
Fiscal Year 2005 $4,930,240 
Fiscal Year 2004 $4,970,500

The following were grant award recipients for FY2010:

The School District of Palm Beach County (Florida)
San Antonio Independent School District (Texas)
 Syracuse City School District (New York)
 St. Louis Public Schools
Allentown School District (Pennsylvania)
The School District of the City of Pontiac (Michigan)
The Colorado Department of Education
Clark County School District (Nevada)
The School Board of Broward County (Florida)
The Los Angeles Unified School District
Hartford School District (Connecticut)
The Mobile County Public School System (Alabama)
Sunnyside, Mabton and Mt. Adams School Districts (Washington)
The West 40 Intermediate Service Center #2 (Illinois)
Pasadena Unified School District (California)
Lincoln Public Schools (Nebraska)
Greene, Jones, and Thomaston-Upson County Schools (Georgia)
Bloom Township High School District (Illinois)
The Massachusetts Department of Education
Chicago Public Schools (CPS)
Haverhill High School (Massachusetts)
Des Moines Independent Community School District (Iowa)
The Davenport Community School District (Iowa)
Washoe County School District (Nevada)
St. Clair County (Illinois)
Multnomah County (Oregon)
Riverside County (California)
Seattle Public Schools
Salem-Keizer School District (Oregon)

The following were grant award recipients for FY2006:

The Arizona Department of Education
Texas Education Agency

The following were grant award recipients for FY2005:
The Minnesota Department of Education
The New Hampshire Department of Education

Unexpected actions

Due to the lack of funding, during the years 2007-2009, the Department of Education issued regulations that allowed states, school districts, and individual schools to eliminate accountability for graduation rate, and allowed them to cease reporting of the graduation rate for minority students.

References

United States federal education legislation